This is a list of all captains of the Melbourne Football Club, an Australian rules football club in the Australian Football League (AFL) and AFL Women's.

VFL/AFL

AFL Women's

References

 
Melbourne
Melbourne Football